Tonkawa Tribal Housing is a census-designated place (CDP) in Kay County, Oklahoma, United States. It was first listed as a CDP prior to the 2020 census and is inhabited by members of the Tonkawa Tribe of Indians of Oklahoma.

In addition to residences, the CDP is home to Tonkawa Casino. The community is bordered to the east by the Chikaskia River, a south-flowing tributary of the Salt Fork of the Arkansas River.

Demographics

References 

Census-designated places in Kay County, Oklahoma
Census-designated places in Oklahoma
Tonkawa